Church of the Sepulchre of Saint Mary, also Tomb of the Virgin Mary, is a Christian tomb in the Kidron Valley – at the foot of Mount of Olives, in Jerusalem – believed by Eastern Christians to be the burial place of Mary, the mother of Jesus. The Status Quo, a 250-year old understanding between religious communities, applies to the site.

History

The Sacred Tradition of Eastern Christianity teaches that the Virgin Mary died a natural death (the Dormition of the Theotokos, the falling asleep), like any human being; that her soul was received by Christ upon death; and that her body was resurrected on the third day after her repose, at which time she was taken up, soul and body, into heaven in anticipation of the general resurrection. Her tomb, according to this teaching, was found empty on the third day.

Roman Catholic teaching holds that Mary was "assumed" into heaven in bodily form, the Assumption; the question of whether or not Mary actually underwent physical death remains open in the Catholic view. On 25 June 1997  Pope John Paul II said that Mary experienced natural death prior to her assumption into Heaven.

A narrative known as the Euthymiaca Historia (written probably by Cyril of Scythopolis in the 5th century) relates how the Emperor Marcian and his wife, Pulcheria, requested the relics of the Virgin Mary from Juvenal, the Patriarch of Jerusalem, while he was attending the Council of Chalcedon (451). According to the account, Juvenal replied that, on the third day after her burial, Mary's tomb was discovered to be empty, only her shroud being preserved in the church of Gethsemane. In 452 the shroud was sent to Constantinople, where it was kept in the Church of Our Lady of Blachernae (Panagia Blacherniotissa).

According to other traditions, it was the Cincture of the Virgin Mary which was left behind in the tomb, or dropped by her during Assumption.

Archaeology
In 1972, Bellarmino Bagatti, a Franciscan friar and archaeologist, excavated the site and found evidence of an ancient cemetery dating to the 1st century; his findings have not yet been subject to peer review by the wider archaeological community, and the validity of his dating has not been fully assessed.

Bagatti interpreted the remains to indicate that the cemetery's initial structure consisted of three chambers (the actual tomb being the inner chamber of the whole complex), was adjudged in accordance with the customs of that period. Later, the tomb interpreted by the local Christians to be that of Mary's was isolated from the rest of the necropolis, by cutting the surrounding rock face away from it. An edicule was built on the tomb.

A small upper church on an octagonal footing was built by Patriarch Juvenal (during Marcian's rule) over the location in the 5th century; this was destroyed in the Persian invasion of 614. During the following centuries the church was destroyed and rebuilt many times, but the crypt was left untouched, as for Muslims it is the burial place of the mother of prophet Isa (Jesus). It was rebuilt then in 1130 by the Crusaders, who installed a walled Benedictine monastery, the Abbey of St. Mary of the Valley of Jehoshaphat; the church is sometimes mentioned as the Shrine of Our Lady of Josaphat. The monastic complex included early Gothic columns, red-on-green frescoes, and three towers for protection. The staircase and entrance were also part of the Crusaders' church. This church was destroyed by Saladin in 1187, but the crypt was still respected; all that was left was the south entrance and staircase, the masonry of the upper church being used to build the walls of Jerusalem. In the second half of the 14th century Franciscan friars rebuilt the church once more. The Greek Orthodox clergy launched a Palm Sunday takeover of various Holy Land sites, including this one, in 1757 and expelled the Franciscans. The Ottomans supported this "status quo" in the courts. Since then, the tomb has been owned by the Greek Orthodox Church and the Armenian Apostolic Church of Jerusalem, while the grotto of Gethsemane remained in the possession of the Franciscans.

The church

Preceded by a walled courtyard to the south, the cruciform church shielding the tomb has been excavated in a rock-cut cave entered by a wide descending stair dating from the 12th century. On the right side of the staircase (towards the east) there is the chapel of Mary's parents, Joachim and Anne, initially built to hold the tomb of Queen Melisende of Jerusalem, the daughter of Baldwin II, whose sarcophagus has been removed from there by the Greek Orthodox. On the left (towards the west) there is the chapel of Saint Joseph, Mary's husband, initially built as the tomb of two other female relatives of Baldwin II.

On the eastern side of the church there is the chapel of Mary's tomb. Altars of the Greeks and Armenians also own the east apse. A niche south of the tomb is a mihrab indicating the direction of Mecca, installed when Muslims had joint rights to the church. Currently the Muslims have no more ownership rights to this site. On the western side there is a Syriac altar.

The Armenian Patriarchate Armenian Apostolic Church of Jerusalem and Greek Orthodox Church of Jerusalem are in possession of the shrine. The Syriacs, the Copts, and the Ethiopians have minor rights.

Panagia Ierosolymitissa 
Within the church is located a famous icon called Panagia Ierosolymitissa (All-holy Lady of Jerusalem) which, according to tradition, was miraculously created without human intervention.

Authenticity
A legend, which was first mentioned by Epiphanius of Salamis in the 4th century AD, purported that Mary may have spent the last years of her life in Ephesus, Turkey. The Ephesians derived it from John's presence in the city, and Jesus’ instructions to John to take care of Mary after his death. Epiphanius, however, pointed out that although the Bible mentions John leaving for Asia, it makes no mention of Mary going with him. The Eastern Orthodox Church tradition believes that Virgin Mary lived in the vicinity of Ephesus, at Selçuk, where there is a place currently known as the House of the Virgin Mary and venerated by Catholics and Muslims, but argues that she only stayed there for a few years, even though there are accounts of her spending nine years until her death.

Although no information about the end of Mary's life or her burial are provided in the New Testament accounts, and many Christians believe that none exist in early apocrypha, some apocryphon are offered as supporting Mary's death (or other final fate). The Book of John about the Dormition of Mary, written in either the 1st, 3rd, 4th, or 7th century, places her tomb in Gethsemene, as does the 4th century Treatise about the passing of the Blessed Virgin Mary.

The pilgrim Antoninus of Piacenza, writing of travels in 560–570 AD, mentions in that valley was "the basilica of the Blessed Mary, which they say was her house; in which is shown a sepulchre, from which they say that the Blessed Mary was taken up into heaven." Later, Saints Epiphanius of Salamis, Gregory of Tours, Isidore of Seville, Modest, Sophronius of Jerusalem, German of Constantinople, Andrew of Crete, and John of Damascus talk about the tomb being in Jerusalem, and bear witness that this tradition was accepted by all the Churches of East and West.

Other claims
Turkmen Keraites believe, according to a Nestorian tradition that another tomb of the Virgin Mary is located in Mary, Turkmenistan a town originally named Mari.

Other claims are that Jesus, after surviving the crucifixion, travelled to India along with the Virgin Mary where they remained until the end of their lives. The Ahmadiyya movement  believe that Mary was buried in the town of Murree, Pakistan and her tomb is presently located in the shrine Mai Mari da Ashtan. The authenticity of these claims is not yet academically established and has not undergone any scholastic or academic research, nor canonical endorsement from the Holy See, nor anyone else.

Another tradition exists among the Christians of Nineveh in northern Iraq, that the tomb of Mary is located near Erbil, linking the site to the direction of tilt of the former Great Mosque of al-Nuri minaret in Mosul.

See also
 Panagia Ierosolymitissa (famous icon located in the Tomb of the Virgin Mary)
 Abbey of Saint Mary of the Valley of Jehosaphat
 Dormition of the Theotokos (Eastern Orthodox, Oriental Orthodox and Eastern Catholic theologies)
 Assumption of Mary (the same event differently seen by the Roman Catholic theology)
 House of the Virgin Mary, Catholic shrine on Mt. Koressos, Turkey

References

Bibliography

   (about Arculf, p. 17)
 
  (pp. 20–21)
 
 Olsson, Suzanne,  Jesus in Kashmir The Lost Tomb (2019) www.rozabal.com|Investigation in to the alleged final resting place of Mary in Mari Ashtan, Pakistan, with photos and additional resource links.
  (pp. 464–469) 
 
 
  (pp. 210, 219)
  (p. 102)
  (pp. 27, 33, 193)
 
  (pp. 20–21) 
   (pp. 287–306)
 
 (pp. 305–313)
   (pp. 40, 402)

External links
 Tomb of the Virgin Mary at Sacred Destinations provides a description of the interior and history of the site.
 Jerusalem Mary`s Tomb at http://allaboutjerusalem.com
 Assumptions About Mary (comments on the historicity of the site) at Catholic Answers.
 O Svetoj zemlji, Jerusalimu i Sinaju at http://www.svetazemlja.info
 Photos of the Tomb of the Virgin at the Manar al-Athar photo archive

Shrines to the Virgin Mary
Churches in Jerusalem
Mount of Olives
Armenian Apostolic churches in Jerusalem
Syriac Orthodox churches in Jerusalem
Status quo holy places
Catholic Church in Israel
Mary
Tombs in Israel
Classical sites in Jerusalem